is a former Japanese football player.

Club statistics

References

External links

1983 births
Living people
Kansai University alumni
Association football people from Shiga Prefecture
Japanese footballers
J1 League players
J2 League players
Gamba Osaka players
Ventforet Kofu players
Thespakusatsu Gunma players
Association football midfielders
Universiade medalists in football
Universiade gold medalists for Japan